Zoltán Supola (born 11 February 1988) is a Hungarian professional basketball player. He is a combo guard for Soproni KC in Hungary. He was selected to play at the U16s, U18s and U20s European Championships. Previously, he played for Leeds Carnegie in the United Kingdom. He was awarded Hungarian Youth Player of the Year in 2007.

He averaged 16.8 points per game in the 2010/2011 season in EBL Division 1. He led his team with 24 points in their overtime victory over Bristol Academy Flyers in the semi-final. He led all scorers with 22 points in the Division 1 National Final against Reading Rockets but Leeds Carnegie came up short in the end.

References 

1988 births
Living people
Alba Fehérvár players
Alumni of Leeds Beckett University
Basketball players from Budapest
Hungarian men's basketball players
Point guards
PVSK Panthers players
Shooting guards